The Spy Game is the soundtrack from the film of the same name, released on November 13, 2001.

Reception and legacy

William Ruhlmann of AllMusic said the assortment of genres in the soundtrack for Spy Game was good for movie theatre goers but not for music listeners.

The finale of Spooks second series included the tracks "Beirut, a War Zone" and "Operation Dinner Out".

Track listing
All tracks are composed by Harry Gregson-Williams.

 "Su-Chou Prison" – 5:00
 "Muir Races to Work" – 3:32
 "'...He's Been Arrested for Espionage'" – 1:23
 "Red Shirt" – 5:07
 "Training Montage" – 2:34
 "Berlin" – 2:18
 "'It's Not a Game'" – 2:34
 "'You're Going to Miss It'" – 9:15
 "Beirut, a War Zone" – 3:20
 "'My Name Is Tom'" – 2:41
 "All Hell Breaks Loose" – 6:19
 "Explosion & Aftermath" – 2:50
 "Parting Company" – 2:08
 "Harker Tracks Muir" – 3:28
 "The Long Night" – 1:46
 "Muir's in the Hot Seat" – 5:08
 "Back at Su-Chou Prison" – 2:18
 "Operation Dinner Out" – 4:50
 "Spies" (Ryebot Remix) – 2:16
 "Dinner Out" (Rothrock Remix) – 2:38

Vocals courtesy of Khosro Ansari.

References

2000s film soundtrack albums
2001 soundtrack albums